Cross-country skiing at the 2014 Winter Paralympics were held at the Laura Biathlon & Ski Complex near Krasnaya Polyana, Russia. The twenty events were scheduled to be held between 9–16 March 2014.

Events

The program includes 20 events. The events are mostly divided into three classifications (sitting, standing and visually impaired). For each of these classifications, there are three men's events and three women's events. There are also two relay events which combine classifications. Standing skiers are those that have a locomotive disability but are able to use the same equipment as able-bodied skiers, whereas sitting competitors use a sitski. Skiers with a visual impairment compete with the help of a sighted guide. The skier with the visual impairment and the guide are considered a team, and dual medals are awarded.

Men's events
 1km sprint (all classifications)
 10km (all classifications)
 15km (sitting)
 20km (standing and visually impaired)

Women's events
 1km sprint (all classifications)
 5km (all classifications)
 12km (sitting)
 15km (standing and visually impaired)

Relay events
4 x 2.5km mixed relay (combined)
4 x 2.5km open relay (combined)

Competition schedule
The following is the competition schedule for all twenty events.

All times are (UTC+4).

Medal summary

Medal table

Women's events

Men's events

Relay events

See also
Cross-country skiing at the 2014 Winter Olympics

References

 
2014 Winter Paralympics
2014 Winter Paralympics events
Paralympics